The Moving Castle is a house in Taitung City, Taitung County, Taiwan.

History
The 4-story house was built by an owner surnamed Lee, who had served in the National Revolutionary Army and fled Mainland China for Taiwan after the end of the Chinese Civil War. He later served the Republic of China Armed Forces and was based in Tainan. His house was constructed over 30 years with materials left abandoned, such as wood, bricks and glass. In July 2016, the house was severely damaged by Typhoon Nepartak. Lee died in January 2017.

Architecture
The house resembles the house featured in the Japanese movie Howl's Moving Castle. The owner used to live on the second floor and grew vegetables on the third floor.

See also
 List of tourist attractions in Taiwan

References

Buildings and structures in Taitung County
Houses in Taiwan